The 2022–23 season was Falkirk's fourth season in League One following their relegation from the Championship at the end of the 2018–19 season. Falkirk also competed in the League Cup, Challenge Cup and the Scottish Cup.

Summary

Results and fixtures

Pre Season

Scottish League One

Scottish League Cup

Group stage
Results

Knockout stage

Scottish Challenge Cup

Scottish Cup

Player Statistics
 18 March 2023

|-
|colspan="8"|Players who left the club during the 2022–23 season
|-

|}

Team Statistics

League table

League Cup table

Transfers

Players in

Players out

Loans in

Loans out

See also
List of Falkirk F.C. seasons

References

Falkirk
Falkirk F.C. seasons